Eduard Ivanovich Kobozev (born 13 September 1979) is a former Russian professional football player.

Club career
He made his Russian Football National League debut for FC Gazovik-Gazprom Izhevsk on 2 June 1997 in a game against FC Lokomotiv Chita.

External links
 

1979 births
Living people
Russian footballers
FC KAMAZ Naberezhnye Chelny players
FC Akhmat Grozny players
FC Volgar Astrakhan players
Association football midfielders
FC Lokomotiv Moscow players
FC Novokuznetsk players
FC Izhevsk players
FC Zenit-Izhevsk players